My Heart Goes Boom! is a 2020 Spanish jukebox musical comedy film directed by Nacho Álvarez, starring Ingrid García-Jonsson and Verónica Echegui. The film is based on songs by Italian artist Raffaella Carrà.

The film was nominated for three Goya Awards and three Feroz Awards.

Cast
 Ingrid García-Jonsson as María
 Verónica Echegui as Amparo
 Fernando Guallar as Pablo
 Giuseppe Maggio as Massimiliano 
 Fran Morcillo as Lucas
 Fernando Tejero as Chimo
 Pedro Casablanc as Celedonio
 Carlos Hipólito as Ismael
 Natalia Millán as Rosa

Awards

References

External links
 
 

2020 films
2020s musical comedy films
Spanish musical comedy films
2020s Spanish-language films
2020 comedy films
Tornasol Films films
2020s Spanish films